The following is the list of players in the AFL Women's (AFLW) who have either made their AFLW debut or played for a new club during the 2018 AFL Women's season.

Summary

AFL Women's debuts

Change of AFL Women's club

References

Australian rules football records and statistics
Australian rules football-related lists
Debut